Aurorachelys is an extinct genus of turtle which existed in Canada (Nunavut) during the late Cretaceous period, containing a single species, A. gaffneyi.

References

 

Late Cretaceous turtles of North America
Macrobaenidae
Fossil taxa described in 2009
Prehistoric turtle genera